Soraon is a constituency of the Uttar Pradesh Legislative Assembly covering the city of Soraon in the Allahabad district of Uttar Pradesh, India.

Soraon is one of five assembly constituencies in the Phulpur Lok Sabha constituency. Since 2008, this assembly constituency is numbered 255 amongst 403 constituencies.

Election results

2022

2017
Apna Dal (Sonelal) candidate Jamuna Prasad won in 2017 Uttar Pradesh Legislative Elections defeating Bahujan Samaj Party candidate Geeta Devi by a margin of 17,735 votes.
In 2012 Samajwadi Party candidate Satyaveer Munna won the Soraon Vidhan Sabha seat.

2022
Samajwadi Party candidate Geeta Shastri won defeating Apna Dal (Sonelal) candidate Jamuna Prasad Saroj by a margin of 5,914 votes

References

External links
 

Assembly constituencies of Uttar Pradesh
Politics of Allahabad district